Gianni Morbidelli (born 13 January 1968) is an Italian racing driver. He participated in 70 Formula One Grands Prix, debuting on 11 March 1990. He achieved one podium, and scored a total of 8.5 championship points. He currently competes in the TCR International Series.

Racing career

Early career
Morbidelli was born in Pesaro. His father, Giancarlo Morbidelli, was the founder of the Morbidelli motorcycle company which had some success in Grand Prix motorcycle racing. Morbidelli started karting in 1980. He won the EUR-AM championship in 1986, before moving to Italian Formula Three. He became Italian Formula 3 and Formula 3 European Cup champion in 1989, as well as winning two races in Italian Touring Cars. He then moved to the Scuderia Italia Formula One team, doing the first 2 races of the  F1 season as stand-in for Emanuele Pirro, before concentrating on Formula 3000. He won 1 race and finished 5th in the 1990 championship, as well as undertaking test driver duties for Scuderia Ferrari for that year.

Formula One

He briefly joined Ferrari for the 1991 Australian Grand Prix, drafted in after Alain Prost was fired by the team, where Morbidelli earned his first Formula One points, earning half a point for 6th after a rain-shortened race. He managed four-point-scoring positions in two years with the team, including his only podium place finish in the 1995 Australian Grand Prix, earning third place in a race of high attrition. Morbidelli became Footwork Arrows' most successful driver, with a total of eight points for the team.

Morbidelli also competed in the Italian Superturismo Championship for 1995, scoring two race wins, and, after spending a year out in 1996 testing for Jordan, gained another podium that year. He scored no points and was not classified in the championship for that year. His unsuccessful season, and two injuries by separate testing accidents, led to Morbidelli retiring from Formula One racing.

Post-Formula One

In 1998 he drove for Volvo in the British Touring Car Championship, but was not as competitive as his teammate Rickard Rydell, who won that year's title. His only competitive showing was in the summer meeting at Thruxton, where he charged from near the back of the back to finish fourth, passing many cars in the process. Morbidelli then spent several years in various European touring car series', with a high point in the 2001 European Touring Car Championship, where he raced the BMW 320i to fifth place in the championship, winning the last race at Estoril. Morbidelli raced in the Italian round of the 2004 season in a SEAT Toledo, but scored no points and did not contest in further meetings.

Morbidelli drove a Lamborghini in several grand tourer races in 2005, and moved back to touring cars for 2006. Competing in the World Touring Car Championship for N-Technology, he managed two second places in an Alfa Romeo 156. Not as competitive as when he was driving the BMW, he moved back to GT racing for 2007, winning two races in the ADAC GT Masters series. He has had considerable success in the Italian Superstars Championship, where Morbidelli won the title with both Audi RS4 and BMW M3 three years in a row from 2007. The short-lived Speedcar Series gave him another championship title, where he won the 2008–09 championship. The season featured a close fight with defending champion Johnny Herbert, with Morbidelli finishing one place ahead in the final round to win the title.

He is making his WTCC return in 2014, driving a Chevrolet Cruze for Münnich Motorsport. He made his debut in the FIA World Rallycross Championship with the same team at his home round in 2015.

Racing record

Career summary

† Not eligible for points.

Complete International Formula 3000 results
(key) (Races in bold indicate pole position; races in italics indicate fastest lap.)

Complete Formula One results

Complete British Touring Car Championship results
(key) (Races in bold indicate pole position – 1 point awarded all races) (Races in italics indicate fastest lap) (* signifies that driver lead feature race for at least one lap – 1 point awarded)

Complete European Touring Car Championship results
(key) (Races in bold indicate pole position) (Races in italics indicate fastest lap)

Complete European Super Production Championship results
(key) (Races in bold indicate pole position) (Races in italics indicate fastest lap)

Complete World Touring Car Championship results
(key) (Races in bold indicate pole position) (Races in italics indicate fastest lap)

† Driver did not finish the race, but was classified as he completed over 90% of the race distance.

Complete Campionato Italiano Superstars results
(key) (Races in bold indicate pole position) (Races in italics indicate fastest lap)

Complete International Superstars Series results
(key) (Races in bold indicate pole position) (Races in italics indicate fastest lap)

Complete V8 Supercar results

† Not eligible for points.

Complete TCR International Series results
(key) (Races in bold indicate pole position) (Races in italics indicate fastest lap)

† Driver did not finish the race, but was classified as he completed over 75% of the race distance.

Complete FIA World Rallycross Championship results

Supercar

Complete World Touring Car Cup results
(key) (Races in bold indicate pole position) (Races in italics indicate fastest lap)

† Driver did not finish the race, but was classified as he completed over 90% of the race distance.

Complete TCR Europe Touring Car Series results
(key) (Races in bold indicate pole position) (Races in italics indicate fastest lap)

References

 Gianni Morbidelli page on GTMasters.org 
 Driver for Reiter Engineering

External links

 
 

1968 births
Living people
People from Pesaro
Italian racing drivers
Italian Formula One drivers
Ferrari Formula One drivers
British Touring Car Championship drivers
Italian Formula Three Championship drivers
Scuderia Italia Formula One drivers
Minardi Formula One drivers
Arrows Formula One drivers
Sauber Formula One drivers
International Formula 3000 drivers
Speedcar Series drivers
Supercars Championship drivers
World Touring Car Championship drivers
World Rallycross Championship drivers
24 Hours of Spa drivers
Superstars Series drivers
ADAC GT Masters drivers
European Touring Car Championship drivers
TCR International Series drivers
World Touring Car Cup drivers
Sportspeople from the Province of Pesaro and Urbino
Audi Sport drivers
BMW M drivers
Cupra Racing drivers
TCR Europe Touring Car Series drivers